Ikh Bogd Uul National Park is centered on Ikh Bogd ("Great Saint"), the highest mountain in the Altai-Gobi Mountains, a southeastern spur range of the Altai.  The middle and high elevations feature alpine meadows and montane steppe.  The range, with semi-arid deserts to the north and south, supports rare species, such as the near-threatened argali (Ovis ammon) and Pallas's cat (Otocolobus manul).

Topography
The Altai Mountains extend southeastward into Mongolia in a chain of thin ridges, of which Ikh Bogd is the farthest major ridge.

Climate and ecoregion
The climate of the area is cold semi-arid climate (Köppen climate classification (BSk)). This climate is characteristic of steppe climates intermediary between desert humid climates, and typically have precipitation is above evapotranspiration.  At least one month averages below .

Flora and fauna
The park is at mid-to-high elevations supporting montane steppe and subalpine meadows.  The top of the plateau is bare of vegetation.  As of 2007, scientists in the park had recorded 500 species of vascular plants in 218 genera and 51 families.  The area is an important site for Eurasian steppe species of birds, including the vulnerable white-throated bush chat (Saxicola insignis), the Henderson's ground jay (Podoces hendersoni), and the Altai snowcock (Tetraogallus altaicus).

See also
 List of national parks of Mongolia

References

External links
 Park borders, Ikh Bogd Uul National Park, ProtectedPlanet.net

National parks of Mongolia